"Keep Young and Beautiful" is a song by Al Dubin (lyrics) and Harry Warren (music), performed by Eddie Cantor and a chorus in the 1933 film Roman Scandals.

A recording by Abe Lyman and His California Orchestra was released in 1934.

Annie Lennox recorded a cover of the song for her album Diva (1992).

While it does not appear in the original 1980 version, the song is used in act 1 for the 2001 Broadway revival of Warren and Dubin's 42nd Street.  The cast recording is performed by Mary Testa, Jonathan Freeman, and the ensemble.

The song was a favourite of Winston Churchill.

References 

1933 songs
Songs with lyrics by Al Dubin
Songs with music by Harry Warren
Songs written for films